Rodrigo San Miguel (born 21 January 1985) is a Spanish professional basketball player for CB San Pablo Burgos of the LEB Oro.

Professional career
San Miguel was formed at Stadium Casablanca, team of Zaragoza. After playing one year with the top team of the city, CAI Zaragoza, he signs for CB Valladolid, where he rests four years, but the two first ones went on loan to LEBs teams.

After the relegation from Liga ACB of his team, in summer 2008 he signs for Bàsquet Manresa, where he plays during three seasons before being added by Valencia Basket for the two next seasons.

Spain national team
San Miguel played with all Spain national youth teams, achieving in 2001 the bronze medal at the European Championship hosted in Latvia.

Awards and accomplishments

Pro career
Copa Príncipe de Asturias: (1)
2004

Spain national team
European U16 Championship:

References

External links
Profile at ACB.com
Profile at Eurocup website

1985 births
Living people
Basket Zaragoza players
Bàsquet Manresa players
CB Canarias players
CB Murcia players
CB Valladolid players
Liga ACB players
Point guards
Spanish men's basketball players
Sportspeople from Zaragoza
Valencia Basket players